Royal Visit To Open The First Commonwealth Parliament was a 1901 Australian documentary film made by the Limelight Department of the Salvation Army in Australia.

The first Commonwealth Parliament was opened by the Duke of Cornwall and York (later King George V) in Melbourne on 9 May, 1901.

The film included the arrival of the Duke and Duchess of Cornwall and York at St Kilda pier on May 6 and external views around the opening of Federal Parliament on May 9. Other activities were shot during their visit, such as the Duke laying the Boer War Memorial Foundation Stone in Ballarat.

Minimal footage still survives today.

References

External links

1900s Australian films
Australian documentary films
1901 films
1900s documentary films
Black-and-white documentary films
1901 in Australia
Australian silent short films
Limelight Department films